1992–93 Pirveli Liga was the 4th season of the Georgian Pirveli Liga. The 1992–93 season saw 16 teams in competition. Pirveli Liga is the second division of Georgian Football. It consists of reserve and professional teams.

League standings

See also
1992–93 Umaglesi Liga
1992–93 Georgian Cup

Erovnuli Liga 2 seasons
2
Georgia